John White House is a historic building in Chartiers Township, Washington County, Pennsylvania.

It is designated as a historic residential landmark/farmstead by the Washington County History & Landmarks Foundation.

References

External links
[ National Register nomination form]

Houses on the National Register of Historic Places in Pennsylvania
Federal architecture in Pennsylvania
Houses completed in 1806
Houses in Washington County, Pennsylvania
National Register of Historic Places in Washington County, Pennsylvania